Servette FC is a Swiss football club based in Geneva, founded in March 1890 with rugby as its first sporting activity, and named after the Geneva district of the same name. The football section was created on 17 January 1900. They play in the Swiss Super League.

Servette is one of Switzerland's most successful clubs and the most successful Romandy club, winning 17 national titles, as well as 7 Swiss cups. Founded in 1890, the team has spent the majority of its history in the top flight of Swiss football, regularly contesting for the title with rivals Grasshopper Zürich.

However, after their last league title in 1998, Servette began experiencing financial problems, which led to a turbulent decade. The club was relegated to the third division in 2004–05 due to a bankruptcy, but achieved promotion to the Swiss Challenge League after the 2005–06 season, where the club remained until 2011. Servette earned promotion to the Swiss Super League after defeating Bellinzona in a relegation/promotion playoff on 31 May 2011. The club finished fourth in its first season back in the top flight, thereby gaining entrance to the Europa League second round qualification round for the 2012–13 season. However, they were relegated at the end of the 2013 season. They are back in Swiss first tier in 2019, being promoted from a playoff against FC Lausanne-Sport.

History

Early years to bankruptcy 
Founded in 1890, Servette was early on one of the most prolific Swiss football clubs, having won 17 Swiss league championships and seven Swiss cups. Servette were also winners of the Torneo Internazionale Stampa Sportiva, one of the first international football competitions in the world, in 1908. In 1930, Servette organized the Coupe des Nations, predecessor of the UEFA Champions League.

The club was originally founded as the "Football Club de la Servette", a rugby football team based in the Genevan neighbourhood of the same name. Due to the dwindling popularity of this sport in Switzerland, a football section of the club was created, leading to its integration in the Swiss Football Association in 1900. 

Led by Umberto Barberis and Claude "Didi" Andrey, in 1978–1979 the club won all of the competitions it entered – with the exception of the European Cup Winners' Cup where they were eliminated in the quarter-finals on away goals by Fortuna Düsseldorf, that year's finalist. Barberis later became French champion in 1982 with AS Monaco.

Until its bankruptcy, Servette was the only Swiss club to have remained in the top league since its creation in 1890. Servette remained the only club to have never been relegated for sporting reasons, until they finished at the last place, following the 2012–2013 season.

Bankruptcy and revival 

On 4 February 2005, the parent company of the club was declared bankrupt. It had run debts of over 10 million Swiss francs, having not paid the players since the previous November, and consequently the club suffered an exodus of players looking for paying clubs. As a consequence of the bankruptcy Servette Under 21s took over the club name playing two divisions below the original Servette team in 1. Liga, a fate already experienced by regional rivals Lausanne Sports in 2003, and continued to play at the Stade de Geneve in front of smaller crowds.

In the 2005–06 season, a rejuvenated Servette secured promotion to the Challenge League, the second highest division in Switzerland.

In the 2010–11 season, Servette finished 2nd in the Challenge League, thereby qualifying for a relegation/promotion play-off against Super League team AC Bellinzona. Servette lost the initial match in Bellinzona 1–0, but won the return match 3–1 and winning the tie 3–2 on aggregate, securing promotion to the Swiss Super League.

2011 to present 
During the Summer 2011 transfer window, Servette FC made very few signings, considering the club had been promoted from the second division to the Super League. Barroca, Issaga Diallo, Carlos Saleiro and Abdoulaye Fall (the latter failed to receive a work permit) were signed as permanent transfers, in addition to Ishmael Yartey and Roderick Miranda joining the club on loan from Benfica. Costinha, a former Portugal international and Champions League winner with FC Porto, was appointed as the club's Sporting Director, after he had been previously fired by Sporting Lisbon. With a largely unchanged squad from their previous season in the second division, Servette achieved very impressive results in the first half of the season, including victories over FC Zurich, BSC Young Boys, Neuchatel Xamax, FC Lucerne, local rivals FC Lausanne-Sport and a 4–0 away win over arch-rivals FC Sion. Despite achieving overall impressive results in the first half of the season, manager João Alves was fired, and was replaced by his compatriot João Pereira, to the disappointment of many of Servette's supporters.

In December 2011, reports surfaced that Servette was unable to pay players' salaries, in addition to other expenses. In January 2012, one of the club's star performers and leading goalscorers, Matías Vitkieviez, was sold to Young Boys for only 150,000 CHF. In February 2012, Servette filed for bankruptcy a second time. On 12 March 2012, chairman Majid Pishyar sold the club to a consortium headed by Hugh Quennec, president of the city's hockey club, Genève-Servette HC. The club was initially given one month to secure the funding necessary to come out of bankruptcy proceedings, and was successful in doing so. Pishyar remains as "honorary president" through the end of the 2011–12 season.

In April 2012, the decision was made to reinstate manager João Alves, who had achieved promotion and impressive results in the first half of the season, and to fire his replacement João Pereira, who had failed to improve the club's results. Alves' return immediately led to improved results, and the club finished the season's final five matches with four wins and one draw. This included a 2–1 victory over FC Basel on the final day of the season, which ended a run of 17 consecutive losses against FC Basel dating back to 2001, as well as ending Basel's 26 match unbeaten streak. The victory also meant that Servette secured fourth place in their first season back in Switzerland's top flight, granting Servette entry into the second round of qualifying for the 2012–13 UEFA Europa League. The season ended with further good news, as on 24 May 2012, the Swiss Football League granted Servette its license for the 2012–13 season, thus marking the end of Servette's financial worries for the time being.

Servette announced that it would be preparing for the 2012–13 season with friendly matches against Thun, Shakhtar Donetsk, Yverdon-Sport, Étoile Carouge, Lausanne-Sport and Porto. In the transfer market, Servette sold Stéphane Nater and Carlos Saleiro, while Ishmael Yartey and Roderick Miranda were recalled to Benfica from their loan spells. Servette bolstered its ranks by signing Geoffrey Tréand, Alexandre Pasche, Christopher Mfuyi, Kevin Gissi, Simone Grippo, Mike Gomes, and Samir Ramizi. Servette also brought in Genséric Kusunga, Steven Lang, and Kelvin on loan for the season.

On 12 July 2012, it was confirmed that Servette would face Gandzasar FC in the second round of qualifying for the 2012–13 UEFA Europa League. The club won the tie 5–1, progressing to face Rosenborg BK in the third qualifier round, against whom they were eliminated on away goals. Servette's league campaign, meanwhile, went poorly, and the club was relegated (for sporting reasons) for the first time in its 113-year history in May 2013, following a 3–0 away defeat by relegation rivals FC Lausanne-Sport.

On 14 July 2013, Servette began the 2013–14 season in the Swiss Challenge League with a 2–1 win at FC Wohlen.

After finishing 2nd in the 2014–15 Swiss Challenge League, the Swiss Football League refused Servette FC a Challenge League licence meaning that Servette would play in the 1st Promotion League (third tier) during 2015–16. In June 2015 the club held a press conference where it was revealed that Servette FC had new owners – 1890 Foundation – holding 100% of the capital stock of SFC SA. At the same press conference it was declared that 1890 Foundation was a private foundation subject to scrutiny by the public supervisory authority.

While Kevin Cooper stayed on as coach, many players left. On 3 November 2015, Servette FC announced that Kevin Cooper had left the club and William Niederhauser and Thierry Cotting would be temporarily in charge of first team affairs. In January 2016 the club announced that Anthony Braizat had taken charge of first team affairs.

In 2018, Servette hired Alain Geiger as its manager and achieved promotion back to the Swiss Super League as the 2018-2019 Challenge League champions, with a 15 points lead in front of the 2nd ranked FC Aarau. For the first time in more than 15 years, the club has since enjoyed relative stability at the financial, managerial and sport levels, achieving a 4th place finish in the 2019-2020 Super League, a 3rd place in 2020-2021 and a 6th place in 2021-2022.

Stadium 
The home ground of Servette is the Stade de Genève. It was inaugurated on 16 March 2003 after three years of construction. The opening match was played between Servette and Young Boys. With an all-seater capacity of 30,084, the Stade de Genève is the third largest stadium in Switzerland, and hosted three group matches in the 2008 European Football Championship.

Servette moved to the Stade de Genève from their old ground, the Stade des Charmilles, in 2003. The Charmilles was inaugurated on 28 June 1930, with the first game drawing a crowd of 14,000 on the first match of the Coupe des Nations. The official capacity peaked at 30,000, but a record 40,000 spectators managed to squeeze in for the international game between Switzerland and France on 14 October 1951. Flood lights were installed in 1977 and the stands were entirely covered in 1983. The capacity gradually diminished from the 1980s onward, first to 20,000 in 1985 and then to 9,250 in 1998 when the stadium became an all-seater.

Plans for a new stadium were first launched in 1984, in response to the Charmilles becoming increasingly outdated and run down. A project committee was established in 1992, which proposed to either rebuild the stadium over the course of four years or construct a new stadium elsewhere in Geneva. Meanwhile, with more substantial plans failing to materialize, the poor state of the old stadium became apparent when the main stand, the Tribune A, was declared unsafe in 1995 and closed off. A renovation project began the following year, which saw the main stand re-opened and seats eventually being installed throughout the stadium. Servette would secure another Swiss Championship and a Cup trophy while playing at the Charmilles, before construction on the new Stade de Genève finally commenced in 2000. The last match was played on 8 December 2002 in front of a capacity crowd.

Current squad

Out on loan

Former players 

Europe

Bosnia and Herezgovina

  Alen Škoro 
  Aleksandar Bratić

England

  Martin Chivers

France

  Christian Karembeu

Germany

  Karl-Heinz Rummenigge
  Oliver Neuville

Switzerland

  Lucien Favre
  Jean-Philippe Karlen
  Denis Zakaria 
  Claude Mariétan
  Anthony Sauthier
  Boris Céspedes
  Philippe Senderos
  François Moubandje
  Alexander Frei

South America

  Jorge Valdivia
  Hilton
  Sonny Anderson

Africa

  Jean-Pierre Nsame
  Wilson Oruma

Staff 
Manager
 Alain Geiger

Assistant Coach
 Benoît Roy

Goalkeeper Coach
 Philipp Frei

Team Manager
 Fritz Frick

Doctor
 Alain Dussuyer

Honours 
Swiss Championship: 17
1906–07, 1917–18, 1921–22, 1924–25, 1925–26, 1929–30, 1932–33, 1933–34, 1939–40, 1945–46, 1949–50, 1960–61, 1961–62, 1978–79, 1984–85, 1993–94, 1998–99
Swiss Cup: 7
1927–28, 1948–49, 1970–71, 1977–78, 1978–79, 1983–84, 2000–01
Swiss League Cup: 3
1976–77, 1978–79, 1979–80 (Record)
Swiss Challenge League
2018–19
1. Liga Promotion
2015–16
Torneo Internazionale Stampa Sportiva: 1
1908
Tournoi du Nouvel An du Stade Français et Club Français: 1
1925

Managers

References

External links 

General
Official club website 
Grenats.ch Independent news site 
Servettiens.ch Independent news site 
Enfants du Servette Independent news site 
Historical website 

Fansites
Section Grenat – Servette Ultras 
Maroons 
North Fans 
Vieille Garde 
Deutschweiz'86 

 
Servette
Sport in Geneva
Association football clubs established in 1890
1890 establishments in Switzerland